Pedro Chutró (February 18, 1880 – October 19, 1937) was an Argentine physician who was a surgeon.  He also practiced medicine during World War I.

External links
 

People from Chascomús
Argentine surgeons
1880 births
1937 deaths
20th-century surgeons